Vassa Zheleznova may refer to:
 Vassa Zheleznova (play), a play by Maxim Gorky
 Vassa Zheleznova (film), a 1953 Soviet drama film